Q School 2011 – Event 1 was the first of three qualifying tournaments for the 2011/12 snooker season. It took place from 11 to 16 May 2011 at the World Snooker Academy in Sheffield, England.

Main draw

Section 1

Section 2

Section 3

Section 4

Century breaks
Total: 12
 133  Gary Wilson
 128  David Grace
 122  Ian Burns
 121  Mei Xiwen
 118, 117  Tian Pengfei
 116  Zhang Anda
 114  Steve Judd
 114  Fraser Patrick
 113  Jamie O'Neill
 108  Michael Leslie
 104  David Gilbert

References

Snooker competitions in England
Q School (snooker)
2011 in snooker
2011 in English sport